Totally Random is a Canadian sketch comedy television series produced exclusively for the web and interactive website uniquely intertwined. Both created and produced by Ottawa-based Mountain Road Productions the site officially launched on February 15, 2012 and is majorly funded by The Canada Media Fund's Experimental Stream.

The first episode premiered on April 1, 2012, in the TV section of the website, and was followed by a second episode being released two weeks later. The series is currently on a summer hiatus, and new episodes will air beginning September 1, 2012, to showcase the digital creations (SnowBalls) made on the site,  Totally Random, over the summer.

About

The first of its kind, Totally Random introduces a brand-new interactive form of television along with a safe and creative social networking website aimed at kids aged 7 to 11. The series turns traditional broadcasting on its side by introducing the next generation of kids to digital media and putting their creations in the spotlight, establishing a partnership between the producer and the viewer to create content for the TV series rather than going the traditional route where content creation is the exclusive domain of the producer. The result is a greater sense of ownership for the viewer and more fresh, relevant and timely content being produced.

It is an online entertainment experience where kids can express themselves without limitations or expectations. The proprietary technology that drives the website allows individual creativity, innovation and imagination while sharing the experience with a larger, social network of kids.

The innovative site features a huge library of random elements; supplying kids with raw materials like still images, text, audio, and video, to help them build the coolest, craziest digital creations ever imagined. From these original Seeds, kids can edit the images with our online editor and media library and then pass it on to the Totally Random community. The key to the website is its ability to bring together kids from across the country and around the world as they work on building these digital creations we call SnowBalls.

How It Works

Using the large library of random elements referred to as Seeds, and the website’s photo editor, kids build digital works of art called SnowBalls. The coolest, most tagged and innovative SnowBalls move to the top and are featured in the Totally Random TV series. Presented by energetic hosts Ryley, Jayden, and Mason, the episodes encompass crazy adventures and random comedy skits performed by the TR Kids, Grant, Jason, and Umu. Every episode provides a showcase for the best user-created content, while setting the stage for the seeds and themes of the next episode’s challenges and tasking the audience to come up with cool new content, all the while creating new materials for the kids to use in their next SnowBall.

Reception

Totally Random was showcased in Canadian Living's August 2012 issue, having made the renowned magazine's Editor's Picks for an interactive TV series for kids aged seven to 11.

See also
 All for Nothing?
 Be Real with JR Digs
 Broken House Chronicles
 Design U
 Me, My House & I
 Sheltered
 The Real Estate Adventures of Sandy & Maryse
 The Restaurant Adventures of Caroline & Dave

References

External links
 
 About Totally Random
 Official Totally Random YouTube Channel
 Official Totally Random Twitter
 Official Totally Random Facebook
 Production Company Website
 What is TotallyRandom.ca?
 Totally Random on CTV Morning Live (Ottawa), March 15, 2012
 Mountain Road debuts interactive web/TV series, Kidscreen.com, April 4, 2012
 Interactive Kids Website Links Audience with Digital Creativity, Mediacaster Magazine, April 10, 2012
 New Web-based TV Series Showcases Tweens’ Creativity, Toys and Games Magazine, April 21, 2012

Canadian comedy web series